William Charles Fugate (September 3, 1931 – February 26, 2011) was an American lawyer and politician who served in the Virginia House of Delegates.

References

1931 births
2011 deaths
Democratic Party members of the Virginia House of Delegates